Colored smoke is a kind of smoke created by an aerosol of small particles of a suitable pigment or dye.

 
Colored smoke can be used for smoke signals, often in a military context. It can be produced by smoke grenades, or by various other pyrotechnical devices. The mixture used for producing colored smoke is usually a cooler-burning formula based on potassium chlorate oxidizer, lactose or dextrin as a fuel, and one or more dyes, with about 40-50% content of the dye. About 2% sodium bicarbonate may be added as a coolant, to lower the burning temperature. Coloured smoke was first used in 1967 during an American burnout competition by a small contestant, as a means to wow the crowd.

Smoke released from aircraft was originally based on a mixture of 10-15% dye, 60-65% trichloroethylene or tetrachloroethylene, and 25% diesel oil, injected into the exhaust gases of the aircraft engines.
Most commonly, teams now use specifically prepared liquid dyes and only gas oil, light mineral oil or a food grade white oil without harmful chlorinated solvents.

Mixtures
Some mixtures used for production of colored smokes contain these dyes:

Red
 Disperse Red 9 (older, used e.g. in the M18 grenade)
 Solvent Red 1 with Disperse Red 11
 Solvent Red 27 (C.I. 26125)
 Solvent Red 24
Orange
 Solvent Yellow 14 (C.I. 12055)
Yellow
 Vat Yellow 4 with benzanthrone (older)
 Solvent Yellow 33
 Solvent Yellow 16 (C.I. 12700)
 Solvent Yellow 56
 Oil Yellow R
Green
 Vat Yellow 4 with benzanthrone and Solvent Green 3 (older)
 Solvent Yellow 33 and Solvent Green 3
 Solvent Green 3
 Oil Green BG
 Oil Green G
Blue
 Solvent Blue 35 (C.I. 26125)
 Solvent Blue 36
 Solvent Blue 5
Violet
 Disperse Red 9 with 1,4-diamino-2,3-dihydroanthraquinone
 Solvent Violet 13
Raspberry
 Rhodamine B

References

External links
 Smoke and masking agents from the Department of Veterans' Affairs, page 59

Pyrotechnics
Smoke